Loktev (from локоть meaning elbow) is a Russian masculine surname, its feminine counterpart (in Slavic countries) is Lokteva. It may refer to:

Aleksei Loktev (1939–2006), Russian actor
Denis Loktev (born 2000), Israeli swimmer
Julia Loktev (born 1969), Russian-American film director and video artist
Konstantin Loktev (1933–1996), Russian ice hockey player 

Russian-language surnames